In social studies, a political ideology is a certain set of ethical ideals, principles, doctrines, myths or symbols of a social movement, institution, class or large group that explains how society should work and offers some political and cultural blueprint for a certain social order. A political ideology largely concerns itself with how to allocate power and to what ends it should be used. Some political parties follow a certain ideology very closely while others may take broad inspiration from a group of related ideologies without specifically embracing any one of them. An ideology's popularity is partly due to the influence of moral entrepreneurs, who sometimes act in their interests. Political ideologies have two dimensions: (1) goals: how society should be organized; and (2) methods: the most appropriate way to achieve this goal.

An ideology is a collection of ideas. Typically, each ideology contains certain ideas on what it considers to be the best form of government (e.g. autocracy or democracy) and the best economic system (e.g. capitalism or socialism). The same word is sometimes used to identify both an ideology and one of its main ideas. For instance, socialism may refer to an economic system, or it may refer to an ideology that supports that economic system. The same term may also refer to multiple ideologies, which is why political scientists try to find consensus definitions for these terms. For example, while the terms have been conflated at times, communism has come in common parlance and in academics to refer to Soviet-type regimes and Marxist–Leninist ideologies, whereas socialism has come to refer to a wider range of differing ideologies which are most often distinct from Marxism–Leninism.

Political ideology is a term fraught with problems, having been called "the most elusive concept in the whole of social science". While ideologies tend to identify themselves by their position on the political spectrum (such as the left, the centre or the right), they can be distinguished from political strategies (e.g. populism as it is commonly defined) and from single issues around which a party may be built (e.g. civil libertarianism and support or opposition to European integration), although either of these may or may not be central to a particular ideology. Several studies show that political ideology is heritable within families.

The following list is strictly alphabetical and attempts to divide the ideologies found in practical political life into several groups, with each group containing ideologies that are related to each other. The headers refer to the names of the best-known ideologies in each group. The names of the headers do not necessarily imply some hierarchical order or that one ideology evolved out of the other. Instead, they are merely noting that the ideologies in question are practically, historically, and ideologically related to each other. As such, one ideology can belong to several groups and there is sometimes considerable overlap between related ideologies. The meaning of a political label can also differ between countries and political parties often subscribe to a combination of ideologies.

Anarchism 

 Political internationals
 Anarkismo (platformism and specifism)
 International of Anarchist Federations (synthesis anarchism)
 International Confederation of Labor (anarcho-syndicalism and revolutionary syndicalism)
 International Union of Anarchists (anarcho-communism)
 International Workers' Association (anarcho-syndicalism)

Classical

Post-classical

Contemporary

Opposition 
 Anti-anarchism
 Authoritarianism

Religious variants

Regional variants

African

American

Asian

European

Oceanian 

 Australia
 New Zealand

Authoritarianism

General

Other

Opposition 
 Anti-fascism
 Anti-monarchism
 Decolonization

Religious variants 
 Theocracy

Regional variants

African

American

Asian

European

Communitarianism

General

Other

Regional variants 
 Kibbutz
Obshchina
Singapore
Zadruga

Communism 

 Political internationals

Authoritarian

Leninism

Marxism–Leninism

Libertarian

Marxism

Other

Opposition 
 Anti-communism
 McCarthyism
 Anti-Marxism
 Anti-socialism

Religious variants 

 Christian communism
 Bruderhofs
 Diggers
 Hutterites
 Shakers
 Islamic communism
 Jewish communism

Regional variants

African

American

Asian

European

Oceanian 

 Australia
 New Zealand

Conservatism 

 Political internationals
 International Democrat Union (conservatism)
 International Monarchist League (monarchism)

General

Reactionary

Opposition

Religious variants

Regional variants

African

American

United States

Asian

European

Oceanian

Corporatism

General

Other

Religious variants 

 Christian corporatism
 Distributism

Regional variants

Western Europe

Democracy

General

Other

Direct democracy movements

Pirate politics 

Political internationals

Opposition 
 Anti-democratism

Religious variants

Christian democracy 

 Political internationals
 Centrist Democrat International (Christian democracy)
 Christian Democrat Organization of America (Christian democracy)

General 

 Distributism
 Social credit movement
 Gremialismo
 Popularism

Other

Other 
 Christian democracy
 Islamic democracy
 Jewish democracy
 Theodemocracy

Regional variants

African 

 Egypt
 Morocco

Asian

American

European

Oceanian 

 Australia

Environmentalism 

 Political internationals
 Friends of the Earth (environmentalism)
 Global Greens (green politics)
 World Ecological Parties (bright green environmentalism)

Bright green environmentalism

Deep green environmentalism

Light green environmentalism

Other

Opposition 
 Anti-environmentalism
 Wise use movement

Religious variants

Regional variants

African 

 South Africa

American 

 United States

Asian

European 

 Switzerland

Oceanian 

 Australia
 New Zealand

Fascism and Nazism

General

Other

Opposition

By country

Religious variants

Regional variants

African 

 Rwanda
 South Africa
 Nazism
 Zaire

American

Asian

European

Oceanian 

 Australia
 New Zealand
 Neo-Nazism

Identity politics 

 Political internationals
 International Council of Women (feminism)
 Minority Rights Group International (minority rights)
 Unrepresented Nations and Peoples Organization (indigenous rights and self-determination)

Age-related rights movements

Animal-related rights movements

Disability-related rights movements

Feminism

General

Opposition 
 Antifeminism

Chronological variants

Ethnic and social variants

Religious variants

Regional variants

African

American

Asian

European

Oceanian 

 Australia
 New Zealand

LGBT social movements

Men's movement

Regional variants

Self-determination movements

African-American

Indigenous peoples

Latin American

Separatist and supremacist movements

Ethnic

Black 
 Black nationalism
 Black separatism
 Black supremacism

White 
 Alt-right movement
 White nationalism
 White separatism
 White supremacism

Regional variants

African 

 South Africa

American

Asian 

 Pakistan

European 
 
 Belgium
 Bosnia, and Herzegovina
 Georgia
 Russia
 Separatism in Chechnya
 Separatism in Dagestan
 Separatism in Tatarstan
 Separatism in Ural
 Serbia
 Spain
 Basque separatism
 Catalan separatism
 Ukraine
 United Kingdom

Oceania 

 Australia
 Tasmania

Gender 

 Feminist separatism
 Lesbian separatism
 Homonationalism
 Matriarchy
 Patriarchy

Religious variants

Student movements

General 
 Anarchist free school movement
 Student activism

Regional variants

Liberalism 

 Political internationals
 Liberal International (liberalism)
 Transnational Radical Party (radicalism)

General

Other

Opposition 
 Anti-liberalism
 Illiberal democracy

Regional variants

African

American

Asian

European

Oceanian 

 Australia
 New Zealand

Libertarianism 

 Political internationals
 Center for a Stateless Society (left-libertarianism)
 International Alliance of Libertarian Parties (right-libertarianism)
 International of Anarchist Federations (anarchism)
 International Union for Land Value Taxation (geoism)
 Liberty International (right-libertarianism)

Left-libertarianism

Right-libertarianism

Other

Opposition 
 Anti-libertarianism

Religious variants 
 Christian libertarianism
 Libertarian Christianity

Regional variants

African 
 South Africa
 Anarchism

American

United States

Asian 
 Hong Kong

European 
 United Kingdom
 Anarchism
 Anarcho-communism
 Anarcho-naturism
 Individualist anarchism
 Thatcherism

Oceanian 
 Australia
 Anarchism
Anarcho-technocracy

Nationalism 

 Political internationals
 International Conference of Asian Political Parties (pan-Asianism and regionalism)
 The Movement (neo-nationalism and right-wing populism)
 Unrepresented Nations and Peoples Organization (nationalism and self-determination)

General

Other

Opposition

Religious variants

Regional variants

African

American

Asian

European

Oceanian 
 Australia
 New Zealand
 Māori
 South Island

Unification movements

Populism 

 Political internationals
 Foro de São Paulo (democratic socialism, left-wing populism, social democracy and socialism of the 21st century)
 The Movement (neo-nationalism and right-wing populism)
 Progressive International (democratic socialism, left-wing populism, progressivism and social democracy)

General

Left-wing populism

Right-wing populism

Other

Regional variants

African 

 Arab Spring movement

Asian

American

European

Oceanian 

 Australia
 One Nation Party
 New Zealand
 New Zealand First

Progressivism 

 Political internationals
 Progressive Alliance (progressivism and social democracy)
 Progressive International (democratic socialism, left-wing populism, progressivism and social democracy)

General 
 Economic progressivism
 Social progressivism
 Techno-progressivism
 Transnational progressivism

Other 
 Progressive conservatism
 Reform movement
 Social justice movement
 Technocracy movement

Opposition 
 Anti-progressivism

Religious variants 
 Islamic progressivism

Regional variants

Religio-political ideologies 

 Political internationals
 Centrist Democrat International (Christian democracy)
 Hizb ut-Tahrir (Islamism)
 Humanist International (humanism)
 Muslim Brotherhood (Islamism)

General

Political atheism and agnosticism 
 Atheist feminism
 Marxist–Leninist atheism
 Secular humanism
 Secular liberalism
 State atheism

Political Baháʼí Faith 
 New world order (Baháʼí)
 opposition

Political Buddhism

Political Christianity

Political Confucianism 
 Neo-Confucianism
 New Confucianism

Political Hinduism

Political indigenous religions 
 Maori environmentalism

Political Islam

Political Judaism

Political Neopaganism

Political Shinto 
 State Shinto
 Showa Statism

Political Sikhism 
 Khalistan movement
 Sikh feminism

Political Taoism 
 Huang–Lao
 Way of the Five Pecks of Rice
 Way of the Taiping

Political Zoroastrianism 
 Mazdakism

Satirical and anti-politics

General 

 Abstentionism
 Apoliticism

Other 

 Populism
 Anti-politics

Religious variants 

 Political quietism

Regional variants

Social democracy 

 Political internationals
 Foro de São Paulo (democratic socialism, left-wing populism, social democracy and socialism of the 21st century)
 Progressive Alliance (progressivism and social democracy)
 Progressive International (democratic socialism, left-wing populism, progressivism and social democracy)
 Socialist International (democratic socialism and social democracy)

General

Other

Opposition 

 Anti-welfarism
 Lemon socialism
 Social fascism

Regional variants

African

American

Asian

European

Oceanian 

 Australia
 Melanesia
 New Zealand

Socialism 

 Political internationals
 Foro de São Paulo (democratic socialism, left-wing populism and socialism of the 21st century)
 Progressive International (democratic socialism, left-wing populism, progressivism and social democracy)
 Socialist International (democratic socialism and social democracy)
 World Socialist Movement (anti-Leninism, classical Marxism, impossibilism and international socialism)

General

Authoritarian

Libertarian

Other

Opposition 
 Anti-socialism

Religious variants

Regional variants

African

American

Asian

European

Oceanian

Syndicalism 

 Political internationals
 International Confederation of Labor (anarcho-syndicalism and revolutionary syndicalism)
 International Workers' Association (anarcho-syndicalism)

General

Other

Opposition 
 Anti-unionism

Regional variants

Transhumanism 

 Political internationals
 Humanity+ (transhumanist politics)

General 

 Anarcho-transhumanism
 Democratic transhumanism
 Libertarian transhumanism

Other

Regional variants 
 United States

See also 

 Direct democracy
 Ideology
 List of communist ideologies
 List of forms of government
 List of ideologies named after people
 List of political systems in France
 Participatory democracy
 Political international
 Political party
 Representative democracy
 Suffrage
 Universal suffrage

References

External links 

list